John Painter,  (born 22 September 1935 in Bellingen, New South Wales) is an Australian academic, New Testament scholar, and Christian theologian specializing in Johannine literature. He is currently Professor of Theology at Charles Sturt University in Canberra.

Biography
Painter studied at Moore Theological College, the University of London, and the University of Durham. Before taking up his present position he had previously been Associate Professor at the University of Cape Town and La Trobe University. Painter was one of the translators of the Common English Bible.

Painter is married to Gillian and has two daughters. In 2001 he was awarded the Centenary Medal for "service to Australian society and the humanities in the study of religion." 

Works

Books

Articles 
 
 
 
 
  (Discussing )
 
 
 
 
 
 
 
 
 
 
 
 — (2004). Sacrifice and Atonement in the Gospel of John. Israel und seine Heilstraditionen im Johannesevangelium, 287–313.
 
 
 — (2007). The incarnation as a New Testament key to an Anglican public and contextual theology [Paper in: Public But Not Official: Anglican Contributions to Australian Life.]. St Mark's Review, (203), 61.
 — (2007). The signs of the messiah and the quest for eternal life. In What we have heard from the beginning: The past, present, and future of Johannine studies. (pp. 233–256). Baylor University Press.
 — (2008). 'The Light Shines in the Darkness' : Creation, Incarnation, and Resurrection in John. In Resurrection of Jesus in the Gospel of John (pp. 21–46). Mohr Siebeck.
 — (2009). A New Climate: The Theologian as Biblical Interpreter. In Embracing Grace: the theologian's task: essays in honour of Graeme Garrett (pp. 51–65). Barton Books.
 — (2009). The Johannine Epistles as Catholic Epistles. In Catholic Epistles and Apostolic Tradition (pp. 239–305). Baylor University Press.
 — (2010). An Anglican approach to public affairs in a global context. St Mark's Review, (213), 9-31.
 
 — (2012). The generosity of God in the world: Preaching from John, 1 John and James. St Mark's Review, (219), 35.
 
 
 
 
 — (2014). Mark and the Pauline mission. Two authors at the beginnings of Christianity, 527–553.
 
 — (2018). The place of the Johannine canon within the New Testament canon. In The usefulness of scripture: Essays in honour of Robert W. Wall (pp. 178–202). Penn State University Press.

References

1935 births
20th-century Christian theologians
21st-century Christian theologians
Academics of Durham University
Alumni of Durham University
Alumni of the University of London
Australian biblical scholars
Australian Christian theologians
Bible commentators
Academic staff of Charles Sturt University
Fellows of the Australian Academy of the Humanities
Johannine literature
Academic staff of La Trobe University
Living people
Moore Theological College alumni
New Testament scholars
People from the Mid North Coast
Recipients of the Centenary Medal
Translators of the Bible into English
Academic staff of the University of Cape Town